City of Gold is a 1957 Canadian documentary film by Colin Low and Wolf Koenig, chronicling Dawson City during the Klondike Gold Rush. It made innovative use of archival photos and camera movements to animate still images, while also combining narration and music to bring drama to the whole. Its innovative use of still photography in this manner has been cited by Ken Burns as the source of inspiration for his so-called Ken Burns effect, a type of panning and zooming effect used in video production to animate still images.

The film is narrated by Pierre Berton and produced by the National Film Board of Canada.

Production
The film grew out of an earlier 1952 idea to promote tourism and sport in Yukon. In researching the film, Low and Koenig found some still photos in an Ottawa archive and tried to improve the panning method Low had employed on his 1955 visual arts documentary, Jolifou Inn. Low then discovered a much larger set of archival images of the Yukon Gold Rush, from photographer Eric A. Hegg's collection at the University of Washington in Seattle. The problem of how to animate the images via camera movement prior to the invention of computer-assisted animation cameras was resolved by Kroitor, who enlisted British mathematician Brian Salt to devise mathematical tables, and developed a device dubbed the 'Kroitorer' that allowed one to take single photos of the archival images as if photographing real-life scenes with a hand-held camera.

Awards
 1957 Cannes Film Festival, Cannes, France: First Prize, Documentary, 1957
 Canadian Film Awards, Toronto: Genie Award, Film of the Year 1958
 Cork International Film Festival, Cork, Ireland: First Prize - Statuette of St. Finbarr, General Interest 1957
 Vancouver International Film Festival, Vancouver: First Prize, Documentary 1958
 Festival dei Popoli, Florence, Italy: Gold Medal, 1960
 Columbus International Film & Animation Festival, Columbus, Ohio: Chris Award, First Price 1960
 Ibero-American-Filipino Documentary Film Contest, Bilbao, Spain: First Prize, 1959
 American Film and Video Festival, New York: Blue Ribbon, History & Biography, 1959
 Yorkton Film Festival, Yorkton, Saskatchewan: Golden Sheaf Award, Best Film, General 1958
 International Festival of Mountain and Exploration Films, Trento, Italy: Gold Medal 1958 
 Chicago Festival of Contemporary Arts, University of Illinois Chicago: Documentary Prize 1958
 International Festival of Films on People and Countries, La Spezia, Italy: Gold Caravelle, 2nd prize 1958
 Canadian Film Awards, Toronto: Genie Award, Award of Merit 1958
 Festival of Experimental and Documentary Films, Santiago, Chile: Honourable Mention 1960
 SODRE International Festival of Documentary and Experimental Films, Montevideo, Uruguay: Honourable Mention 1958
 Robert J. Flaherty Film Awards, City College Institute of Film Techniques: Honourable Mention, 1958
 30th Academy Awards, Los Angeles: Nominee, Short Subject, Live Action, 1958

See also
Still image film
A Chairy Tale - Another NFB short nominated alongside City of Gold  in the same category

References

External links 
 
 

1957 short films
1950s English-language films
Dawson City
Documentary films about cities
Films directed by Colin Low (filmmaker)
Documentary films about historical events
Films about the Klondike Gold Rush
National Film Board of Canada documentaries
Canadian short documentary films
Short Film Palme d'Or winners
Films set in Yukon
Pierre Berton
1957 documentary films
Films scored by Eldon Rathburn
Films produced by Tom Daly
Canadian animated documentary films
1957 animated films
Canadian animated short films
National Film Board of Canada animated short films
1950s animated short films
English-language Canadian films
1950s Canadian films